

The Vienna Porcelain Manufactory Augarten (German: Wiener Porzellanmanufaktur Augarten) is a porcelain manufactory located in Vienna, Austria. It was founded in 1718 and is one of the oldest porcelain manufacturers in Europe. The Vienna Porcelain Manufactory Augarten is also home to the Augarten Porcelain Museum, which displays a collection of historic and contemporary porcelain pieces. In addition to its porcelain products, the company also produces glassware, cutlery, and other home accessories.

History 
The historic Vienna Porcelain Manufactory (1718–1864) was the second porcelain manufactory to be established in Europe. Dating back to a privilege given by the emperor to Claudius Innocentius du Paquier in 1718, it was, after Meissen porcelain, Europe's second oldest producer of hard-paste porcelain. Since 1744, pieces bore the shield from the coat of arms of the Dukes of Austria as a trademark.

The original Vienna manufactory went out of business in 1864. After that, the main porcelain factory of the Austro-Hungarian empire was the Herend Porcelain Manufactory, which had been competing with the Vienna manufactory as purveyors to the Imperial Court. The porcelain of the original Vienna manufactory is often referred to as Alt Wien ("Old Vienna") porcelain, to distinguish it from the products of the new Augarten manufactory.

The new porcelain manufactory in Augarten was established in 1923. It revived the traditions of the old Vienna porcelain manufactory by continuing the production methods and patterns of the historic manufactory.

See also 
 Porcelain manufacturing companies in Europe

References

External links 
 
  

Austrian pottery
Culture in Vienna
Leopoldstadt
Manufacturing companies based in Vienna
Porcelain
Austrian companies established in 1923
Manufacturing companies established in 1923